Since the 2007 municipal reform, no mayor had been re-elected in Struer Municipality, with Venstre holding office for 2007-2009 and 2014–2017, while the Social Democrats had held office for 2010-2013 and 2018–2021. Mads Jakobsen, who was mayor from 2014 to 2017, ran to return as mayor after losing the position as a result of the 2017 election.

In the election, Venstre would gain a seat while he Social Democrats lost a seat. A blue bloc majority by winning 12 of the 21 seats was clear.
On 8 December 2021 it was confirmed that Mads Jacbonsen would return as mayor.

Electoral system
For elections to Danish municipalities, a number varying from 9 to 31 are chosen to be elected to the municipal council. The seats are then allocated using the D'Hondt method and a closed list proportional representation.
Struer Municipality had 21 seats in 2021

Unlike in Danish General Elections, in elections to municipal councils, electoral alliances are allowed.

Electoral alliances  

Electoral Alliance 1

Electoral Alliance 2

Electoral Alliance 3

Results

Notes

References 

Struer